Gaj Singh  (born 13 January 1948), referred to as Bapji, is an Indian politician who served as a member of the Indian parliament and as Indian High Commissioner to Trinidad and Tobago. He became the titular Maharaja of Jodhpur in 1952.

Early years and accession
Singh was born in Royal, Rajput Family. He is the son of Maharaja Hanwant Singh of Jodhpur by his first wife, Maharani Krishna Kumari of Dhrangadhra. He succeeded to the titles and dignities of his father when only four years of age, in 1952, when his father died suddenly in a plane crash. He was enthroned shortly afterwards.

The infant and his siblings were raised by their mother, Rajmata Krishna Kumari. At the age of eight, Gaj Singh was sent first to Cothill House, a prep school in Oxfordshire, England, and then to Eton College and Christ Church, Oxford, where he obtained a degree in Philosophy, Politics, and Economics.

Singh's full title as Maharaja was His Highness Raj Rajeshwar Saramad-i-Raja-i-Hind Maharajadhiraja Maharaja Shri Gaj Singhji II Sahib Bahadur, Maharaja of Marwar.

Family

In 1970, Gaj Singh returned to Jodhpur to take up his duties as Maharaja of Jodhpur. In 1973, he married Hemalata Rajye, daughter of the Raja of Poonch, a major feudatory state of Kashmir State and his wife Nalini Rajya Lakshmi Devi, a daughter of King Tribhuvan of Nepal and Queen Ishwari Rajya Lakshmi Devi. They are the parents of two children, being:
A daughter, Shivranjani Rajye (born 22 August 1974), and
A son, Shivraj Singh (born 30 September 1975).

Derecognition
In 1971, the constitution of India was amended. On 5 November 1971, the Maharaja and other princes were deprived of their privy purses, the government annuities that had been guaranteed to them both in the constitution and in the covenants of accession whereby their states were merged with the Dominion of India in the 1940s, with the enactment of the amendment. The same amendment also deprived them of other privileges, such as diplomatic immunity. In the Constitution of India promulgated in 1971, the Government of India abolished all official symbols of princely India, including titles, privileges, and remuneration (privy purses).

Career
Later, Gaj Singh served as Indian High Commissioner to Trinidad and Tobago. He also served a term in the Rajya Sabha, the Upper House of the Indian Parliament.

On 20 July 1992, he founded a day-cum-residential girls' school named Rajmata Krishna Kumari Girls' Public School, named after his mother.

Honours and awards 
 Servare et Manere:
  Memorial Medal of Tree of Peace in a Special class with rubies. International peace award granted by a Slovak non-governmental organization (2022).

See also
Rulers of Marwar

References

External links
 Maharaja of Jodhpur (official website)

1948 births
Living people
High Commissioners of India to Trinidad and Tobago
Rajya Sabha members from Rajasthan
People from Jodhpur
People educated at Cothill House
People educated at Eton College
Alumni of Christ Church, Oxford
Indian royalty